The 11th New Jersey Infantry Regiment was a regiment of infantry from New Jersey that served in the Union Army during the American Civil War.

Service
The 11th New Jersey Infantry Regiment was recruited in May 1862 at Camp Perrine, located near the New Jersey State Prison near Trenton. The regiment was led by Colonel Robert McAllister, who had seen service as lieutenant colonel in the 1st New Jersey Volunteer Infantry.

The regiment left New Jersey for Washington on August 25. By mid-September the 11th remain in Washington at half strength due to a measles epidemic.

The 11th saw combat at the Battle of Fredericksburg, Virginia in December 1862.

The regiment also saw action at the following battles:
Battle of Fredericksburg - December 12–13, 1862
Battle of Chancellorsville - May 3, 1863
Salem Heights, Virginia - May 3, 1863
Battle of Chancellorsville - May 4, 1863
Battle of Gettysburg - July 2–3, 1863
Beverly Ford, Virginia - August 19, 1863
Locust Grove, Virginia - November 27, 1863
Mine Run, Virginia - November 29, 1863
Battle of Spotsylvania Court House - May 10–12, 1864
Barker's Mills, Virginia - June 10, 1864
Petersburg, Virginia - June 16–23 & July 1, 1864

The regiment was mustered out June 6, 1865.

Commanders
Colonel Robert McAllister
Lieutenant Colonel Stephen Moore

Original field & staff officers
Company A - Captain Phillip J. Kearny
Company B - Captain William H. Meeker
Company C - Captain John J. Willis
Company D - Captain Valentine Mutchler or Luther Martin
Company E - Captain Thomas J. Halsey
Company F - Captain John H. Grover
Company G - Captain Theodore Stagg
Company H - Captain Dorastus B. Logan
Company I - Captain John T. Hill
Company K - Captain William B. Dunning

Casualties
Officers Killed or Mortally Wounded: 11
Officers Died of Disease, Accidents: 0
Enlisted Men Killed or Mortally Wounded: 131
Enlisted Men Died of Disease, Accidents: 107

See also
List of New Jersey Civil War Units

References

External links
 

Units and formations of the Union Army from New Jersey
1862 establishments in New Jersey
Military units and formations established in 1862
Military units and formations disestablished in 1865